Tom meets Zizou – Not a Midsummer Night's Dream (German title: Tom Meets Zizou – Kein Sommermärchen) is a documentary film by Aljoscha Pause made in 2011. The film deals with the life and career of professional football player Thomas Broich.

Background and story
From 2003 to 2011, Aljoscha Pause made a long-term film documentary about former Bundesliga professional Thomas Broich. It traces Broich's career in the German Fußball-Bundesliga which began promisingly but ended after numerous professional and personal setbacks with a transfer to the Australian club Brisbane Roar in 2010.

The result of some 40 meetings and interviews that generated more than 100 hours of raw footage over eight years, the 135-minute cinema documentary entitled Tom meets Zizou – Not a Midsummer Night’s Dream debuted as the opening film of the 8th International Football Film Festival “11mm” in Berlin on 25 March 2011.

The film was distributed nationwide by mindjazz pictures with an opening date of 28 July 2011. The project enjoyed the support of the DFB Cultural Foundation.

The film was released on DVD and Blu-ray in late 2011 and was screened at international festivals including the International Young Audience Film Festival in Posen, the Thinking Football Film Festival in Bilbao, The CINEfoot Festival in Rio de Janeiro and the Flutlicht Film Festival in Basel (on 1 February 2014 in a double feature with “TRAINER!” on the topic of “Failure”). “Tom meets Zizou” has been translated into English, Polish, Spanish and Portuguese. German broadcaster WDR showed a 90-minute TV version on 21 August 2012.

The film's title is a reference to Broich's former email address, tommeetszizou@aol.com and Broich's then-hero Zinedine Zidane, nicknamed "Zizou".

Reviews

Awards
The film was honored as “especially worthwhile” by the German Film and Media Evaluation institute (Deutschen Film- und Medienbewertung, FBW) for the following reasons:

In addition, Tom meets Zizou – Not a Midsummer Night’s Dream was awarded the VDS Television Prize in 2012 (for the 90-minute TV version), and was nominated in 2013 as the “best football film of all time.”

References

External links

Tom Meets Zizou – Kein Sommermärchen, Filmlexikon 

2011 films
Documentary films about association football
2011 documentary films
Documentary films about sportspeople
German documentary films
2010s German films